Sayan Mondal (born 10 November 1989) is an Indian cricketer who plays for Bengal cricket team. He plays in three formats of the game, namely List A cricket, First class cricket and Twenty20.

References

1989 births
Living people
Indian cricketers
Bengal cricketers